This is a list of Television in South Korea related events from 2023.

Ongoing

Animation

New Series & Returning Shows

Drama

Animation

Ending

Drama

References

2023 in South Korean television